Tanga people are a tribe of Papua New Guinea that lives in the Tanga Islands and Feni Islands of Tanir Rural LLG and three villages (Sena, Muliama and Warangansau) in the Matalai Rural LLG of Namatanai District of New Ireland Province. They speak the Tangga language which has since been split into three separate languages which are now spoken by the Tangans. These languages are: Niwer Mil, Warwar Feni and Fanamaket. Their population according to the 2011 Papua New Guinea Census Report is 12,466 people. Tubuan, Sokapana and Ingiet are the secret societies practised by the Tanga people. F.L.S. Bell has a collection on Tanga Islands in the University of Sydney Library in Australia.

References 
A. Capell "A lost tribe in New Ireland" Taja  December 1967 Vol. 6 No. 10, pp. 499–509
F. L. S. Bell "Report on field work in Tanga" Oceania March 1934 Vol. 4 No. 3, pp. 290–309
F. L. S. Bell "Warfare among the Tanga" Oceania March 1935 Vol. 5 No. 3, pp. 253–279
F. L. S. Bell "Sokapana: A Melanesian Secret Society" The Journal of the Royal Anthropological Institute Vol. 65 (July–December 1935), pp. 311–341
F. L. S. Bell "Courtship and marriage among the Tanga" Taja  December 1935 Vol. 1 No. 12, pp. 20–20
F. L. S. Bell "Dafal" The Journal of the Polynesian Society 1936 Vol. 45 No. 179, pp. 83–98
F. L. S. Bell "The avoidance situation in Tanga" Oceania  March 1936 Vol. 6 No. 3, pp. 306–322
F. L. S. Bell "Death in Tanga" Oceania March 1937 Vol. 7 No. 3, pp. 316–339
F. L. S. Bell "The place of food in the social life of the Tanga" Oceania  March 1948 Vol. 6 No. 3, pp. 233–247
F. L. S. Bell "The narrative in Tanga" Taja September 1949 Vol. 4 No. 3, pp. 99–101
F. L. S. Bell "Land Tenure in Tanga" Oceania  September 1953 Vol. 24 No. 1, pp. 28–57
F. L. S. Bell "Male and Female in Tanga: Being a Description of Certain Sexual Aspects of the Ritual Life" Taja September 1957 Vol. 5 No. 4, pp. 137–148
F. L. S. Bell "Tanga-English,English-Tanga dictionary" Oceania lingusitic monographs, No.21, 1977 Sydney, University of Sydney

References

External links 
 

Ethnic groups in Papua New Guinea